Sumit Godara is an Indian politician and elected member of 15th Legislative Assembly of Rajasthan from Lunkaransar (Rajasthan Assembly constituency) representing Bharatiya Janata Party (BJP ) .

References

Living people
Bharatiya Janata Party politicians from Rajasthan
Rajasthan MLAs 2018–2023
1973 births